Joshua Solomon-Davies (born 20 November 1999) is a Saint Lucian semi-professional footballer who plays as a right back for the Saint Lucia national football team. He currently plays for Marine in the Northern Premier League, winning promotion to the Northern Premier League Premier Division at the end of the 2021/22 season following victory in the play off final.

Early life
Solomon-Davies was born in Saint Lucia to an English father, and moved to England at the age of six. His grandfather, Carlos "Ball" Southwell was a Saint Lucian footballer.

While a pupil at St Anselm's College, Birkenhead (Edmund Rice Trust), he won the national 100 metres final in 11.3 seconds, competing in the English Schools' Athletics Championships, in Bedford, in July 2015, aged 15.

Career
At age 17 Solomon-Davies made his professional debut with Tranmere Rovers in a 1-0 National League win over Maidstone United on 29 April 2017.

The following season, on the 24th of April, 2018, Solomon-Davies made his second senior team appearance for Tranmere Rovers in the home fixture against Solihull Moors, losing 2–1.

Having declined the offer of a professional contract with Tranmere Rovers, Solomon-Davies signed with Stalybridge Celtic on the 27th of September, 2018, on a non-contract basis.

In August 2019, he signed for Marine. Solomon-Davies appeared in every round as Marine F.C. progressed to the Third Round of the FA Cup during the 2020/21 season where they were rewarded with a home tie versus Tottenham Hotspur, the widest gap (167 places) between two competing clubs in FA Cup history.

International career
On the 22nd of October, 2016, Solomon-Davies made his international debut, aged 16, for Saint Lucia's Under-20 team against Haiti in the Caribbean Union qualifying tournament for the 2017 FIFA U-20 World Cup held at the Ergilio Hato Stadium, Curaçao. Solomon-Davies went on to represent Saint Lucia throughout the tournament in subsequent games against Trinidad & Tobago and Cuba.

Solomon-Davies made his senior debut for the Saint Lucia national football team in a 1-0 friendly loss to Grenada on the 28th of February, 2019.

Career statistics

Club

International

References

External links
 
 
 Rovers Rearguard Profile
 Stalybridge Celtic Profile

1999 births
Living people
People from Gros Islet Quarter
Saint Lucian footballers
Saint Lucia international footballers
Saint Lucian people of British descent
Stalybridge Celtic F.C. players
Tranmere Rovers F.C. players
Northern Premier League players
National League (English football) players
Association football fullbacks
Marine F.C. players